Stratifin (also known as 14-3-3 protein sigma or 14-3-3σ protein) is a protein encoded by the SFN gene in humans. The protein is named for its presence in stratified epithelial cells.

Interactions 

Stratifin has been shown to interact with PLK4, ERRFI1, MARK3, JUB and YWHAG.

References

Further reading 

 
 
 
 
 
 
 
 
 
 
 
 
 
 
 
 
 
 

14-3-3 proteins